During the 1994–95 English football season, West Bromwich Albion F.C. competed in the Football League First Division.

Season summary
In the 1994–95 season, West Brom started the campaign very poorly with the Baggies winning just one in their first 11 league matches, leaving them bottom of the league and resulting in Burkinshaw being sacked as manager. Grimsby manager Alan Buckley took over the managerial vacancy and managed to keep them away from relegation.

Final league table

Results
West Bromwich Albion's score comes first

Legend

Football League First Division

FA Cup

League Cup

First-team squad
Squad at end of season

Notes

References

West Bromwich Albion F.C. seasons
West Bromwich Albion